Qərchə (also, Garcha, Karcha, and Kerche) is a village in the Ismailli Rayon of Azerbaijan.

References 

Populated places in Ismayilli District